Whenever, If Ever is the debut studio album by American indie rock band The World Is a Beautiful Place & I Am No Longer Afraid to Die, released on June 18, 2013, on Topshelf Records.

Writing and recording
The record was largely written instrumentally as a five-piece band, with the finished versions of the tracks coming together in the studio with the rest of the members contributing their ideas. The album's songs had been written close to a year before the band entered the studio, and the band made demos for all the songs in every stage of the writing process. Nicole noted that many of the songs progressed into something completely different than the direction they started with, while others stayed relatively unchanged. After production had started, Julia Peters offered to perform cello on the record. The band was so impressed with her playing that she was asked to join the band.

Composition

Music
Four vocalists share vocal duties throughout the album.

Lyrics

Track listing

Personnel
 Thomas Diaz – vocals, guitar, synthesizer 
 David Bello – vocals 
 Nicole Shanholtzer – guitar, vocals 
 Joshua Cyr – bass guitar, synthesizer 
 Katie Shanholtzer-Dvorak - synthesizer, vocals 
 Steven Buttery – percussion 
 Christopher Teti – guitar 
 Julia Peters – cello 
 Patrick Malone – trumpet 
 Greg Horbal – guitar, vocals, piano, synthesizer

Chart performance

References

2013 debut albums
The World Is a Beautiful Place & I Am No Longer Afraid to Die albums
Topshelf Records albums